Sir Thomas Dawson Brodie, 1st Baronet of Idvies FRSE (1832–1896) was a Scottish lawyer and peer and progenitor of the Scottish law firm Brodies.

Life
He was born Thomas Brodie in Edinburgh on 26 December 1832 the son of John Clerk Brodie WS (1811-1888) and his wife Bethia Garden Souter. His mother died when Thomas was 12 years old and his father remarried.

He was educated at Edinburgh Academy from 1841 to 1847 then completed his education at Harrow. He then studied law at Edinburgh University before joining his father's law firm "Gibson, Craig & Brodie" at 26 Moray Place. He was created Writer to the Signet in 1857. From 1865 he ran a branch of his father's firm at 14 Alva Street moving to 4 St Colme Street in 1876 and to 9 Ainslie Place in 1880.

Only in 1885 did the Brodies separate from the other partners and become known as "John Brodie & Sons". By this stage John Brodie was aged 74 and no longer an active partner. When his father died in 1888 he took over the law firm based at 5 Thistle Street in Edinburgh's First New Town.

In July 1890 he was elected a Fellow of the Royal Society of Edinburgh. His proposers were Sir William Thomson, Lord Kelvin, Peter Guthrie Tait, Sir Arthur Mitchell and A Beatson.

In 1892 Queen Victoria created him as 1st Baronet of Idvies, Idvies being a country estate his father had purchased in Angus, east of Forfar.

He died at home, 9 Ainslie Place on the Moray Estate (formerly the home of James Ivory, Lord Ivory) in the West End of Edinburgh on 6 September 1896. He is buried with his parents in nearby Dean Cemetery. The monument was sculpted by John Hutchison.

Family

In 1861 he married Charlotte Frederika Furnell. She died in 1871 and in 1876 he married Anne Dawson (d.1903). Only from 1877 did he style himself Dawson Turner.

Memorials

Brodie appears as a donor in the memorial window on the south stair of the Scottish National Portrait Gallery on Queen Street, Edinburgh.

References
 

1832 births
1896 deaths
People educated at Edinburgh Academy
People educated at Harrow College
Alumni of the University of Edinburgh
Scottish lawyers
Fellows of the Royal Society of Edinburgh
Burials at the Dean Cemetery